Fenster is a surname, from the German language word for "window". Notable persons with this surname include:

 Della Dumbaugh, formerly Della Fenster, American historian of mathematics
 Aaron Fenster, Canadian engineer
 Ariel Fenster (born 1943), Canadian science promoter and lecturer at McGill University
 Boris Fenster (1916–1960), Russian dancer, choreographer and ballet master
 Darren Fenster (born 1978), American baseball player and coach
 Fred Fenster (born 1934), American metalsmith
 Gigi Fenster, South African-born New Zealand author, creative writing teacher and law lecturer
 Julie M. Fenster (born 1957), American author of historical articles and books
 Mark Fenster, American lawyer and author in Florida
 Saul Fenster, president of New Jersey Institute of Technology during 1978–2002
 Karol Martesko-Fenster, American media executive

Fictional characters
 Arch Fenster, a character in the American 1962–63 sitcom I'm Dickens, He's Fenster
 Fred Fenster, a character in the 1995 film The Usual Suspects

Other uses
 Fenster, another name for a tectonic window (a geologic structure)
 Fenster School, American school in Catalina Foothills, Arizona
 Schnell Fenster, Australian band, active 1986–1992
 "Tausend Fenster", Austrian entry in the Eurovision Song Contest 1968